Sancedo is a village and municipality located in the region of El Bierzo (province of León, Castile and León, Spain) . According to the 2004 census (INE), the municipality had a population of 554 inhabitants.

References

Municipalities in El Bierzo